Momisis borneana is a species of beetle in the family Cerambycidae. It was described by Vives and Heffern in 2012.

References

Astathini
Beetles described in 2012